Exoglossum is a genus of mound-building freshwater fish of the minnow family (Cyprinidae) containing two species, commonly known as  cutlip minnows, although the individual species, particularly Exoglossum maxillingua, are also locally known by that name.

Species of this genus usually range from 3 inches to 18 inches when sexually mature. In many areas these minnows are valued as both panfish and baitfish.

Species 
 Exoglossum laurae (C. L. Hubbs, 1931) (Tonguetied minnow)
 Exoglossum maxillingua (Lesueur, 1817) (Cutlips minnow)

References
 

 
Freshwater fish of North America
Taxa named by Constantine Samuel Rafinesque